This article documents the 2009–10 season of Lancashire football club Bury F.C.

League table

Results

League Two

FA Cup

League Cup

Football League Trophy

Players

First-team squad
Includes all players who were awarded squad numbers during the season.

Left club during season

References 

Bury F.C. seasons
Bury F.C.